Amaxia collaris is a moth of the family Erebidae. It was described by E. Dukinfield Jones in 1912. It is found in Brazil.

References

Moths described in 1912
Amaxia
Moths of South America